The Hemisphere Project, also called simply Hemisphere (codename Hudson Hawk), is a mass surveillance program conducted by US telephone company AT&T and paid for by the White House Office of National Drug Control Policy and the Drug Enforcement Administration (DEA).

Overview

Hemisphere is a public–private partnership between the White House’s Office of National Drug Control Policy (ONDCP) and AT&T, the third-largest provider of mobile telephone services in the US. In 2013 the programme was reported to be overseen by AT&T employees embedded within the Atlanta head office (two employees) and Houston and Los Angeles regional offices (one employee each) of the ONDCP’s High Intensity Drug Trafficking Area (HIDTA) programme; these employees’ salaries are paid through the ONDCP’s HIDTA programme, as opposed to by AT&T.

AT&T collects metadata relating to all calls routed through AT&T’s exchanges, including calls made from non-AT&T handsets. The data collected include the phone numbers of the caller and recipient, the date, time and length of calls and, in some cases, a caller’s location. An estimated four billion new call detail records are created on AT&T’s database every day, though it is possible for a call to be recorded more than once. As AT&T maintains records of calls placed as well as calls received, a single call may be recorded against both the caller’s telephone number (as an outgoing call) and the recipient’s telephone number (as an incoming call); the number of records generated for a single call are also reported to depend on its length, as well as on participants’ locations and whether or not they are moving. Call detail records held as part of the project reportedly date back as far as 1987. 

Data are typically forwarded to investigators by email in response to administrative subpoenas, which the DEA is authorised to issue independently of the courts. As the existence of the project is officially secret, investigators are not permitted to disclose the source of any intelligence obtained through the Hemisphere Project in case reports, court filings or other documents. Official guidance instead requires all intelligence be cited as “information obtained from an AT&T subpoena”. 

Requests for urgent information from the project database reportedly take as little as an hour to fulfil.

History

While the partnership between AT&T and the Office of National Drug Control Policy (ONDCP) began in 2007, data held on the Hemisphere Project database reportedly date back as far as 1987. In September 2013, the New York Daily News cited an anonymous law enforcement official as saying “we [law enforcement] rarely need to look at anything older than 18 months”.

The public became aware of the project in 2013, when activist Drew Hendricks received a 27-slide PowerPoint presentation — marked “law enforcement sensitive” — containing details of the project in response to a Freedom of Information Act (FOIA) request. The file, which was confirmed as authentic, lists suspects allegedly identified using data from the project database. While law enforcement describes the project as an attempt “to keep up with drug dealers” and “subpoenaing drug dealers’ call records […] a bread-and-butter tactic in the course of criminal investigations”, several of the suspects listed in the presentation were wanted in connection to crimes unrelated to drugs. They included a man who impersonated a general and ran over an intelligence officer at a Navy base in San Diego; a South Carolina woman accused of calling in bomb threats to schools, hospitals and local businesses; and a group of men who stole from a jewellery store in Los Angeles.

The White House said that the data raises no privacy concerns, a statement contradicted by Jameel Jaffer of the ACLU, who said he would "speculate that one reason for the secrecy of the program is that it would be very hard to justify it to the public or the courts."

The program was likened to proposals made by legislators after the disclosure of PRISM, in particular one by Representative Adam Schiff who had called for a "look at changing the telephone metadata program by having phone companies retain their own data, rather of  the government."

Spokespeople for Sprint, Verizon and T-mobile USA would not comment on whether their companies offered similar services.

See also
 Mass surveillance in the United States

References

External links
 Synopsis of the Hemisphere Project, The New York Times
 Scott Shane interview, September 3, 2013, Democracy Now!

2013 scandals
Espionage projects
Mass surveillance
Obama administration controversies
Privacy in the United States
Privacy of telecommunications
Surveillance scandals
Drug policy of the United States
Illegal drug trade in the United States
Law enforcement in the United States
American secret government programs
Drug control law in the United States